Paralaoma innesi, also known as Innes' pinhead snail, is a species of land snail that is endemic to Australia's Lord Howe Island in the Tasman Sea.

Description
The depressedly turbinate shell of the mature snail is 0.95 mm in height, with a diameter of 1.7 mm, and a low spire. It is golden in colour. The whorls are rounded and slightly shouldered, with impressed sutures and closely spaced radial ribs. It has a roundedly lunate aperture and moderately widely open umbilicus.

Distribution and habitat
The snail is most abundant on the summits of the southern mountains of the island.

References

 
 

 
innesi
Gastropods of Lord Howe Island
Taxa named by Tom Iredale
Gastropods described in 1944